Léon Alfred Fourneau (9 December 1867, in Paris – 17 May 1953, in Paris) was a French humourist, music-hall artist, playwright and songwriter. Originally trained as a lawyer he invented the stage- and penname Xanrof by inversion of the Latin fornax of his French surname fourneau ("furnace"), before finally legally changing his name to Léon Xanrof. Yvette Guilbert experienced early success singing Xanrof's songs at Rodolphe Salis' cabaret Le Chat Noir.

Born in an bourgeois upper middle class environment, with his father a wealthy physician,young  Leon Fourneau was inclined to a literary and poetry career, but his family insisted on him graduating (Baccalauréat) and taking up further éducation (he obediently undertook successful law studies and registered at the paris bar, aged 23), but he still felt inclined to song and opérette writing.
The Xanrof alias was a measure of appeasement towards his family and the bar auhorities as léon Fourneau kept writing and publishing songs for cabaret singers.

A bizarre incident then occurred: As he was crossing the bustling rue Lepic (Lower Montmartre)he was almost run down by a closed  winter Fiacre (French Hansom cab with a closed body). The reason for the cab driver being neglectful was both salacious and funny: As Leon Fourneau was dusting himself he saw one of the cab's blinds briefly lifted and got a glimpse of a half-naked couple gazing at him . The cab-ride was what was termed a "course d'alcôve" (lovebed-ride),a not unfrequent instance in "Belle époque"Paris where illegitimate couples enjoyed "comprehensive flirtation" in the intimacy of a cab (At least two short humoristic tales by Alphonse Allais harp on this particular theme).

Leon Fourneau quickly wrote a witty and somewhat racy song called ''Le Fiacre, he was paid 50 gold francs for it and the song was inserted in a comic intermede in an operette called "Les Mohicans de Paris"adapted from a novel By Alexandre Dumas about Paris underworld.

In this song a cuckolded old man walking in a Parisian street hears kisses, moans, and his wife's voice coming from inside a suspiciously rolling and pitching cab. He rushes forward, trips on the slippery wooden paved road ad is squashed to death by the cab. The lady then opens the door and rejoices, telling her lover that they do not need hiding any more. She then urges her lover to pay the princely tip of cent sous (Five gold francs) to the cab driver.

The song then rocketed to French and international success when it was sung by the then-beginner Yvette Guilbert.

Yvette Guilbert's career as a singer was definitely launched and most of her best-remembered songs where written by Léon Fourneau who undertook official action to have his pen name duly registered as his official surname. In time he would resign from the bar, taking up full time operette and song writing work and being elected at the SACEM board (SACEM stands for Société des Auteurs et Compositeurs de Musique and is the mutual organisation in charge of music author's rights).

Works 
 Songs
 À présent qu'on n'est plus ensemble, dittie, lyrics by Léon Xanrof, music by E. Jaquinot.
Rive gauche, chansons d'étudiants (1888)
Chansons sans-gène (1890)
Chansons parisiennes, répertoire du Chat noir (1890-1891)
Chansons à Madame (1891)
Pochards et pochades, histoires du Quartier Latin (1891)
Chansons à rire (1892)
 L'Anarchiste, lyrics and music by Léon Xanrof. P. Dupont, (1892). 
L'Amour et la vie, nouvelles (1894)
Lettres ouvertes (1894)
Bébé qui chante (1894)
Chansons ironiques (1895)
La Forme ! la fô.. ô.. orme ! (1897)
Juju, recueil de nouvelles et de saynètes (1897) 
L'Œil du voisin, recueil de contes (1897)
De l'autel à l'hôtel (1902)
Une et un font trois (1903)
C'est pour rire (1911)
Le Mécanique de l'Esprit (1931)
Chacun treize à la douzaine (1933)
Theatre
1888: Chez le peintre, farce d'atelier in 1 act, with M. Bernac, Paris, Théâtre d'Application, 8 March
1896: Ohé, l'amour ! revue in 2 tableaux, with Cellarius, Paris, Scala, 18 April
1897: Madame Putiphar, three-act operetta, with Ernest Depré, music byEdmond Diet, Paris, Théâtre de l'Athénée, 27 February
1901: Pour être aimée, three-act comedy, with Michel Carré, Paris, Théâtre de l'Athénée, 27 February
1903: The Prince Consort, three-act comedy, with Jules Chancel, Théâtre de l'Athénée, 25 November, which was used to create the 1929 film Parade d'amour (The Love Parade).
1905: Son premier voyage, comedy in 1 act and 2 tableaux, Paris, Théâtre des Deux Masques, 5 November
1906: En douceur, one-act comedy, with Pierre Veber, Paris, Théâtre des Mathurins, 23 October
1908: Un coup de foudre, three-act vaudeville, Paris, Théâtre des Folies-Dramatiques, 16 April
1908: S.A.R. (Son Altesse royale), three-act musical comedy, with Jules Chancel, music by Ivan Caryll, Paris, Théâtre des Bouffes-Parisiens, 11 November
1910: Rève de valse, three-act operetta, adaptation by Léon Xanrof and Jules Chancel, after  et , music by Oscar Straus, Paris, Théâtre de l'Apollo
1911: Les Petites étoiles, three-act operetta, with Pierre Veber, music by Henri Hirchmann, Paris, Théâtre Apollo, 23 December
Cinema
1911: La Fête de Marguerite, script by Léon Xanrof, Pathé frères

References

External links 
 

Writers from Paris
1867 births
1953 deaths
19th-century French dramatists and playwrights
20th-century French dramatists and playwrights
French chansonniers
Burials at Montmartre Cemetery